This is a list of songs produced by DJ Pooh.

1980s

1990s

2000s

References

Production discographies
Hip hop discographies
Discographies of American artists